Enebakk Avis (The Enebakk Gazette) is a local Norwegian newspaper published in Enebakk in Akershus county. 

The company Enebakk Avis AS was launched as its own business by Smaalenene Medier AS. The first issue of the paper was published on December 22, 1999. Enebakk Avis is owned by Amedia. The paper is edited by Gunnleik Seierstad.

Circulation
According to the Norwegian Audit Bureau of Circulations and National Association of Local Newspapers, Enebakk Avis has had the following annual circulation:
2000: 1,968
2001: 2,405 
2002: 3,468
2003: 2,527
2004: 2,749
2005: 2,845
2006: 2,985
2007: 2,984 
2008: 3,046
2009: 2,935
2010: 2,939
2011: 2,864
2012: 2,769
2013: 2,671
2014: 2,604
2015: 2,389
2016: 2,408

References

External links
Enebakk Avis home page

Newspapers published in Norway
Norwegian-language newspapers
Mass media in Akershus
Enebakk
Publications established in 1999
1999 establishments in Norway